Kako (ni)je propao rokenrol u Srbiji (trans. How Rock 'n' Roll in Serbia (Didn't) Came to an End) is a book by Duško Antonić, published in 2021. The book features a number of Antonić's essays on Serbian rock scene, as well as a list of 100 best Serbian rock music albums published after the dissolution of SFR Yugoslavia. The list was formed according to the poll of 58 Serbian music journalists and critics, artists and others, similarly to the poll in the 1998 book YU 100: najbolji albumi jugoslovenske rok i pop muzike (trans. YU 100: the Greatest Yugoslav Rock and Pop Music Albums) by Antonić and Danilo Štrbac.

100 Best Serbian Albums Published after the Breakup of SFRY

Statistics

Artists with the most albums
4 Partibrejkers
4 Nikola Vranjković and Block Out
4 Darkwood Dub
4 Kanda, Kodža i Nebojša
4 Disciplina Kičme
3 Bjesovi
3 Goblini
3 Van Gogh
3 Obojeni Program
2 Eva Braun
2 Goribor
2 YU Grupa
2 Kazna Za Uši
2 Vlada Divljan Old Stars Band
2 Električni Orgazam (including The Black Bomber soundtrack album)
2 Bajaga i Instruktori
2 Atheist Rap
2 Sunshine
2 Orthodox Celts
2 Ritam Nereda
2 Jarboli
2 Đorđe Balašević

The most successful record labels by the number of albums
20 PGP-RTS
15 Metropolis Records
10 B92
10 Odličan Hrčak
5 ITVM
4 Take It Or Leave It Records
4 Automatik Records
3 Mascom Records
2 Long Play Records
2 Carlo Records
2 Hi-Fi Centar
2 Multimedia Music
2 Sorabia Disk
2 Komuna
2 Hard Rock Shop

Voters
The voters were music journalists, critics, artists closely associated to the Serbian rock scene, and others. Each of them suggested twenty Serbian rock albums published after the breakup of SFRY Yugoslavia he or she considered the best. The book features short biographies of every one of them and each one's choice of twenty albums. The list was completed according to their poll.

Duško Antonić - author, journalist, festival organizer
Muharem Bazdulj - writer, journalist, translator
Miloš Cvetković - journalist
Milan Ćunković - journalist
Milorad Dunđerski - journalist, concert organizer
Nemanja Đorđević - photographer
Miša Đurković - political and legal theorist, author
Aleksandar Gajić - author, political analyst, former musician
Aleksandar Gajović - journalist, politician
Branka Glavonjić - journalist
Saša Gočanin - journalist, Take It Or Leave It Records director
Ivan Ivačković - journalist, author
Miloš Ivanović - journalist, concert organizer
Predrag "Karlo" Jakšić - author, former Carlo Records owner
Aleksandar S. Janković - Belgrade Faculty of Dramatic Arts professor, rock critic
Jadranka Janković - journalist
Petar Janjatović - journalist, author
Vladimir "Vlada Džet" Janković - radio host, musician, author
Olga Kepčija - journalist
Petar Kostić - journalist
Goran Kukić - journalist, author
Nenad Kuzmić - journalist
Branimir Lokner - journalist
Ivan Lončarević - journalist and music manager
Andrea Magazin - journalist
Igor Marojević - writer, journalist, musician
Bogomir Mijatović - journalist, author
Milorad Milinković - director, screenwriter, novelist, former musician
Miloš Najdanović - journalist
Aleksandar Nikolić - journalist
Srđan Nikolić - journalist
Predrag Novković - journalist
Vladislav Pejak - concert organizer, music manager
Zoran Panović - journalist, author
Vojislav Pantić - math professor, journalist, art director of Belgrade Jazz Festival
Miloš Pavlović - journalist, translator
Marina Pešić - concert photographer
Milan B. Popović - poet, journalist
Branko Radaković - multimedia artist, director, musician
Aleksandar Raković - historian
Marko Ristić - journalist, photographer
Ivan St. Rizinger - journalist, author, former musician
Branko Rogošić - journalist, author
Zoran Rogošić - journalist, author
Branko Rosić - journalist, novelist, former musician
Vladimir Samardžić - journalist, jazz musician
Jovana Stanković - journalist
Miroslav Stašić - journalist, former musician
Gorčin Stojanović - director, journalist, author
Danko Strahinić - photographer
Goran Tarlać - journalist, author
Igor Todorović - journalist, concert organizer, author, former musician
Anamarija Vartabedijan - painter, concert photographer, teachers' training college professor
David Vartabedijan - painter, graphic designer, journalist, author
Jelena Vlahović - music theorist, journalist
Aleksandar Žikić - journalist, author, former musician
Goran Živanović - journalist, author

Book cover
The book cover features a photograph of Romana Slačala of the band Artan Lili.

See also 
YU 100: najbolji albumi jugoslovenske rok i pop muzike
Rock Express Top 100 Yugoslav Rock Songs of All Times
B92 Top 100 Domestic Songs

References

2021 non-fiction books
Music books
Serbian rock music
Yugoslav rock music